HUTV can stand for:

Health Unlimited Television network, HUTV, Place Based Digital Out of Home network of TV screens deployed in medical waiting areas throughout the province of Alberta Canada.
Harvard Undergraduate Television (HUTV), the Harvard College student-run Internet television network.
HUTV, the closed circuit television station of Hollins University.